Gábor Sárközy or Gabor Sarkøzy (born Sámuel Guttmann, 6 June 1945 – 27 June 2008), known professionally as Sasha Gabor, was a Hungarian-Norwegian actor and director. As a young man, he moved to Norway as a Hungarian refugee, eventually moving to the United States to pursue a career as a pilot, which eventually led to a career in film. While he acted in mainstream films, he was a look-alike  for Burt Reynolds and Sean Connery, which popularized him in adult films, including parodies. He started making pornography at age 38 and retired in his sixties, with over 500 films in his canon. Labelled Norway's most famous porn actor by Morgenbladet, the three-times-married Gabor was described as "a womanizing alcoholic who played accordion, spoke eight languages, and was one of Ron Jeremy's best friends."

Early life

Gabor was born Sámuel Guttmann in Hungary in 1945. He moved to Lillestrøm, Norway in 1957 as a refugee in the wake of the Hungarian Revolution. He left school and he played accordion, trumpet, and double bass for Cirkus Arnardo. He eventually moved to the United States, where he joined the United States Army and went to school to become an airplane pilot.

Career
Prior to acting, Gabor worked as a commercial airline pilot. Gabor eventually lost his commercial pilot license due to alcohol-related arrests.

In the early 1980s, Gabor was acting in small parts in mainstream films in Los Angeles. He was a Burt Reynolds lookalike, which he capitalized on, including working as a stand in for Reynolds in films. In 1982, Gabor met Ron Jeremy while filming the Jerry Lewis comedy Cracking Up. Gabor and Jeremy saw each other again at an Adult Film Association of America gala in 1983. Attendees usually dressed in costumes and Gabor did his Burt Reynolds shtick including arriving in a black sports car complete with a vanity license plate reading "Bandit". Gabor told Jeremy he was interested in the porn industry and Jeremy introduced Gabor to his adult film industry contacts. He was 38 when he made his first adult film.

Gabor acted regularly in films by Bobby Bouchard. He performed in Burt Reynolds parody porn films, using the stage name Turd Wrenolds. He co-starred in the Smokey and the Bandit parody All-American Girls in Heat. Gabor also had plastic surgery to appear more like Reynolds.

Gabor was also a regular in Jeremy's films in the late 1980s, when Jeremy was a director for Leisure Time Entertainment. They filmed many films together, including 20 to 30 films on houseboats at Lake Mead with Samantha Strong and Tracey Adams, the result of having to film out of state due to obscenity laws in Los Angeles. Gabor's alcohol abuse often impacted his ability to get an erection, and Jeremy would often stand in for Gabor. Jeremy estimated that one-third of Gabor's films showed Jeremy's circumcised penis in lieu of Gabors uncircumcised penis. Jeremy would serve as one of Gabor's best friends throughout Gabor's life.

He traveled frequently to Thailand, where he'd vacation and also get plastic surgery, which he documented in photographs. Gabor stopped dying his hair black and let it go gray and got plastic surgery to look more like Sean Connery. Back in the United States, he worked as a Connery lookalike outside of porn, attending special events. Gabor lived in Marina del Rey, California followed by Tampa, Florida.

He retired from acting in 2001 and moved back to Norway after too many alcohol-related arrests and to escape from paying child support. In Norway, Gabor planned to direct the first Norwegian professional porn film. In 2007, Gabor said he was going to direct a Sámi-themed adult film in Kautokeino, Norway. The film was never made.

Views on the film industry

Gabor believed pornographic films were beneficial for men and women to watch, suggesting one can learn that "there is no one way to make girls climax" and that one can "learn many things from porn movies."

Later life and legacy

Gabor was an alcoholic, which Ron Jeremy called "the bane of [Gabor's] existence." Gabor had been arrested for driving under the influence multiple times, having his license suspended indefinitely.

After retiring in 2001, Gabor moved back to Norway. Norwegian journalist Alex Rosén featured Gabor in his documentary series People on the Move for NRK1. The film was supposed to be aired in February 2001, but was delayed until March due to the controversial nature of the program. The film featured Gabor participating in a gang bang.
Gabor died of cardiac arrest on 27 June 2008 on vacation in Bangkok, Thailand. Gabor was married three times and had five children.

References

External links

 
 
 

1945 births
2008 deaths
Hungarian refugees
Refugees in Norway
Hungarian emigrants to Norway
Hungarian expatriates in the United States
Hungarian male pornographic film actors
Norwegian male pornographic film actors
Commercial aviators
20th-century Norwegian accordionists
Hungarian accordionists
People from Lillestrøm
Hungarian pornographic film directors
20th-century Norwegian male actors
21st-century Norwegian male actors
20th-century Hungarian male actors
21st-century Hungarian male actors
Norwegian trumpeters
Hungarian trumpeters
Hungarian bass guitarists
20th-century Norwegian bass guitarists
Hungarian film directors
Norwegian film directors
United States Army Air Forces soldiers
Male actors from Tampa, Florida
People from Marina del Rey, California
Musicians from Tampa, Florida